Gösta Martin Brännström (6 October 1926 – 7 March 1997) was a Swedish sprinter who won a bronze medal in the 4 × 400 m relay at the 1950 European Athletics Championships, together with Tage Ekfeldt, Rune Larsson and Lars-Erik Wolfbrandt. They failed to reach the final at the 1952 Summer Olympics, and finished fourth at the 1954 European Athletics Championships.

Brännström won the national 400 m title in 1951, 1953 and 1956. In 1953 he set national records in the 300 m at 34.0 and in the 400 m at 47.4.

References

1926 births
1997 deaths
Swedish male sprinters
Olympic athletes of Sweden
Athletes (track and field) at the 1952 Summer Olympics
European Athletics Championships medalists
People from Skellefteå Municipality
Sportspeople from Västerbotten County
20th-century Swedish people